The Tiara United Towers is a mixed-use development consisting of two  tall buildings in Business Bay, Dubai. Consisting of two towers, the residential development is Wasl Properties' first mixed-use development in Business Bay. The East tower has 424 units while the West tower has 425 units, varying between one-, two-, three- and four-bedroom apartments as well as duplexes with private pools.

Construction of the Tiara United Towers began in 2006 and was scheduled to be completed in 2009, and the original plan featured two 60-storey towers, one for offices and one for a hotel. The development was then redesigned and put on hold several times. Construction resumed in 2016 and was completed in 2021.

See also 
 List of buildings in Dubai
 List of tallest buildings in Dubai

References

External links
Emporis

Buildings and structures under construction in the United Arab Emirates
Skyscrapers in Dubai
Twin towers